Calappidae is a family of crabs containing 16 genera, of which 7 are only known as fossils:
Acanthocarpus Stimpson, 1871
Calappa Weber, 1795
† Calappella Rathbun, 1919
† Calappilia A. Milne-Edwards, 1873
Calappula Galil, 1997
Cryptosoma Brullé, 1839
Cycloes De Haan, 1837
Cyclozodion Williams & Child, 1989
Mursia A. G. Desmarest, 1823
† Mursilata C.-H. Hu & Tao, 1996
† Mursilia Rathbun, 1918
† Mursiopsis Ristori, 1889
Paracyclois Miers, 1886
Platymera H. Milne Edwards, 1837
† Stenodromia A. Milne-Edwards, 1873
† Tutus Collins in Collins, Portell & Donovan, 2009

Fossils within this family can be found in sediment of Europe, United States, Mexico, Central America, Australia and Japan from Cretaceous to recent (age range: 66.043 to 0.0 Ma).

References

Calappoidea
Extant Cretaceous first appearances
Taxa named by Henri Milne-Edwards
Decapod families